groff (also called GNU troff) is a typesetting system that creates formatted output when given plain text mixed with formatting commands. It is the GNU replacement for the troff and nroff text formatters. 

Groff contains a large number of helper programs, preprocessors, and postprocessors including  eqn, tbl, pic and soelim. There are also several macro packages included that duplicate, expand on the capabilities of, or outright replace the standard troff macro packages.

Groff development of new features is active, and is an important part of free, open source, and UNIX derived operating systems such as Linux and 4.4BSD derivatives — notably because troff macros are used to create man pages, the standard form of documentation on Unix and Unix-like systems.

OpenBSD has replaced groff with mandoc in the base install, since their 4.9 release. So has macOS Ventura.

History 
groff is an original implementation written primarily in C++ by James Clark and is modeled after ditroff, including many extensions. The first version, 0.3.1, was released June 1990. The first stable version, 1.04, was announced in November 1991. groff was developed as free software to provide an easily obtained replacement for the standard AT&T troff/nroff package, which at the time was proprietary, and was not always available even on branded UNIX systems. In 1999, Werner Lemberg and Ted Harding took over maintenance of groff.

See also 

TeX
Desktop publishing

Notes

References

External links
 
 groff mailing list archive (searchable)
 Groff Forum, hosted by Nabble, archiving the groff mailing list into a searchable forum (sadly none of the emails are visible today).
  gives background and examples of troff, including the GNU roff implementation.
 Home page of mom macros

GNU Project software
groff
Free typesetting software